Time Cube was a personal web page, founded in 1997 by the self-proclaimed "wisest man on earth," Otis Eugene "Gene" Ray. It was a self-published outlet for Ray's theory of everything, also called "Time Cube," which polemically claims that all modern sciences are participating in a worldwide conspiracy to teach lies, by omitting his theory's alleged truth that each day actually consists of four days occurring simultaneously. Alongside these statements, Ray described himself as a "godlike being with superior intelligence who has absolute evidence and proof" for his views. Ray asserted repeatedly and variously that the academic world had not taken Time Cube seriously.

Ray died on March 18, 2015, at the age of 87. His website domain names expired in August 2015, and Time Cube was last archived by the Wayback Machine on January 12, 2016 (January 10–14).

Content

Style
The Time Cube website contained no home page. It consisted of a number of web pages that contained a single vertical centre-aligned column of body text in various sizes and colors, resulting in extremely long main pages. Finding any particular passage was almost impossible without manually searching.

A large amount of self-invented jargon is used throughout: some words and phrases are used frequently but never defined, likely terms materially referring to the weakness of widely propagated ideas that he detests throughout the text, that are usually capitalized even when used as adjectives. In one paragraph, he claimed that his own wisdom "so antiquates known knowledge" that a psychiatrist examining his behavior diagnosed him with schizophrenia.

Various commentators have asserted that it is futile to analyze the text rationally, interpret meaningful proofs from the text, or test any claims.

Time Cube concept

Ray's personal model of reality, called "Time Cube," states that all of modern physics and education is wrong, and argues that, among many other things, Greenwich Time is a global conspiracy. He uses various graphs (along with pictures of himself) that purport to show how each day is really four separate days—SUN-UP, MID-DAY, SUN-DOWN, and MID-NIGHT (formerly morning, early afternoon, late afternoon, and evening)—occurring simultaneously.

The following quotation from the website illustrates the recurring theme:

Ray offered $1,000 or $10,000 to anyone who could prove his views wrong. Mike Hartwell of The Maine Campus wrote that any attempt to claim the prize would require convincing Ray that his theory was invalid. The proof would need to be framed in terms of his own model, thus deviating from any form of modern science. "Even if you could pull that off," Hartwell said, "Ray is probably broke."

Reception
Ray spoke about Time Cube at the Massachusetts Institute of Technology in January 2002 as part of a student-organized extra-curricular event during the independent activities period. He repeated his $10,000 offer for professors to disprove his notions at the event; none attempted it. John C. Dvorak wrote in PC Magazine that "Metasites that track crackpot sites often say this is the number one nutty site." He also characterized the site's content as "endless blather." Asked by Martin Sargent in 2003 how it felt to be an Internet celebrity, Ray stated that it was not a position he wanted, but something he felt he had to do as "no writer or speaker understands the Time Cube." Ray also spoke about Time Cube at the Georgia Institute of Technology in April 2005, in a speech in which he attacked the instruction offered by academics.

A 2004 editorial in The Maine Campus student newspaper remarked upon what it called the site's "subtle little racist ideologies" which culminate in Ray describing racial integration as "destroying all of the races."

In 2005, Brett Hanover made Above God (also the name of one of Ray's websites which criticized the idea that God exists), a short documentary film about Ray and Time Cube, which won awards for Best Documentary at the Indie Memphis Film Festival and the Atlanta Underground Film Festival.

Cultural impact
	 
Christopher Bowes has stated he was inspired to write the song "To the End of the World" with the pirate metal band Alestorm after learning of the Time Cube. The song makes multiple references to the cube, and a supposed coverup of "the true nature of time", and was included in their 2017 album No Grave But the Sea.

The Boston rock-n-roll band of MIT graduates, Honest Bob & the Factory-to-Dealer Incentives, released a song called "Time Cube" on their 2004 album "Second & Eighteen." The song's lyrics are inspired by, if not direct quotes from, Ray's website.

References

External links

 Official website archived at the Wayback Machine
 
 Gene Ray interviewed on Tech TV

Internet memes
Internet properties established in 1997
Criticism of science
1997 establishments in the United States
American websites
Fictional cubes
Conspiracy theories
Pseudoscience
Pseudomathematics
Pantheism
Religious belief systems founded in the United States